Pfirman is a surname. Notable people with the surname include:

Cy Pfirman (1889–1937), American professional baseball umpire
Stephanie Pfirman, American climatologist
Tierney Pfirman (born 1994), American professional basketball player